Friman is a surname that may refer to:

 Alice Friman (born 1933), American poet
 Anna Maria Friman (born 1972), Swedish singer
 Jaakko Friman (1904–1987), Finnish speed skater
 Leo Friman (born 1951), Finnish musician known by his stage name Freeman
 Niklas Friman (born 1993), Finnish ice hockey player
 Oskari Friman (1893–1933), Finnish wrestler
 Ville Friman (born 1980), Finnish musician

See also 
 Freeman (disambiguation)
 Freeman (surname)
 Frimann